Útvina is a municipality and village in Karlovy Vary District in the Karlovy Vary Region of the Czech Republic. It has about 600 inhabitants.

Administrative parts
Villages of Český Chloumek, Chylice, Přílezy, Sedlo and Svinov are administrative parts of Útvina.

Transport
The highest airport in the Czech Republic is located in the municipal territory. It is a small airport for sport flying.

References

Villages in Karlovy Vary District